Pickworth is a village and civil parish in the South Kesteven district of Lincolnshire, England. The population of the civil parish including Braceby and Sapperton was 243 at the 2011 census.  It is situated approximately  both east from Grantham and south from Sleaford.

The 1086 Domesday Book lists Pickworth as having forty households and a church.

The Church of England parish church of Saint Andrew is a Grade I listed building built of limestone and dating from the 12th century. The 14th-century rebuilding of the church is said to date from 1356, probably by the Pickworth family. Over the chancel arch are 14th-century wall paintings dated to about 1380.

References

Further reading

External links

Rex Bourne's page on the village

Civil parishes in Lincolnshire
South Kesteven District
Villages in Lincolnshire